Perry Township is one of the nineteen townships of Wood County, Ohio, United States.  The 2010 census found 1,605 people in the township.

Geography
Located in the southeastern corner of the county, it borders the following townships:
Montgomery Township - north
Scott Township, Sandusky County - northeast corner
Jackson Township, Seneca County - east
Loudon Township, Seneca County - southeast corner
Washington Township, Hancock County - south
Cass Township, Hancock County - southwest corner
Bloom Township - west
Portage Township - northwest corner

Part of the city of Fostoria is located in southeastern Perry Township, and the village of West Millgrove lies in the township's north.

Name and history
Perry Township was established in 1833. It is one of twenty-six Perry Townships statewide.

Government
The township is governed by a three-member board of trustees, who are elected in November of odd-numbered years to a four-year term beginning on the following January 1. Two are elected in the year after the presidential election and one is elected in the year before it. There is also an elected township fiscal officer, who serves a four-year term beginning on April 1 of the year after the election, which is held in November of the year before the presidential election. Vacancies in the fiscal officership or on the board of trustees are filled by the remaining trustees.

References

External links
County website

Townships in Wood County, Ohio
Townships in Ohio